The third season of the American ABC fantasy-drama series Once Upon a Time was announced on May 10, 2013. Executive producers Adam Horowitz and Edward Kitsis also noted that the season would be split into two volumes, with the first premiering on September 29, 2013, through December 15, 2013, and the second from March 9, 2014, through May 11, 2014.

The first volume's plot revolved around the main characters traveling to Neverland from Storybrooke to retrieve a kidnapped Henry Mills from the possession of Peter Pan. After successfully retrieving Henry, the characters returned to Storybrooke, only to be returned to their original worlds following Pan's attempt to cast a new curse, leaving Emma Swan and Henry to escape to New York City. The second volume's plot followed the characters' past journey in the Enchanted Forest and how they were brought back to Storybrooke by the Wicked Witch of the West, while also documenting Emma's mission to break the new curse and save her family.

Existing fictional characters introduced to the series during the season include the main antagonists of the two volumes, Peter Pan and the Wicked Witch of the West, alongside Tinker Bell, Ariel, Prince Eric, Ursula, Medusa, Rapunzel, Lumiere, the Wizard of Oz, Glinda the Good Witch, the Good Witch of the North, the Witch of the East, Dorothy Gale, Blackbeard and Elsa.

Premise
After Henry is kidnapped, Emma, Regina, David, Mary Margaret, Mr. Gold, and Hook travel to Neverland to save him. While in Neverland, new allies are made such as Tinker Bell and the heroes attempt to defeat Peter Pan and the Lost Boys, who are trying to restore Neverland's magic with Henry's heart. Their time in Neverland results in Peter Pan returning with them to Storybrooke, where he unleashes Regina's original curse with hopes to make Storybrooke the new Neverland. As the heroes and Peter Pan collide, a sacrifice is made, with everyone returning to the Enchanted Forest except Emma and Henry. However, a year later, everyone is returned to Storybrooke via another curse as the Wicked Witch of the West has plans of her own. Emma and Henry are brought back to Storybrooke to help break the latest curse and defeat the Wicked Witch, which leads to a trip to the past with dire consequences.

Cast and characters

Regular
 Ginnifer Goodwin as Snow White / Mary Margaret Blanchard
 Jennifer Morrison as Emma Swan
 Lana Parrilla as Evil Queen / Regina Mills
 Josh Dallas as Prince Charming / David Nolan
 Emilie de Ravin as Belle French
 Colin O'Donoghue as Captain Hook / Killian Jones
 Michael Raymond-James as Baelfire / Neal Cassidy
 Jared S. Gilmore as Henry Mills 
 Robert Carlyle as Rumplestiltskin / Mr. Gold

Recurring

 Beverley Elliott as Widow Lucas / Granny
 Sean Maguire as Robin Hood
 Robbie Kay as Malcolm / Peter Pan / Pied Piper
 Lee Arenberg as Dreamy / Grumpy / Leroy
 Gabe Khouth as Sneezy / Tom Clark
 Parker Croft as Felix
 Rebecca Mader as Wicked Witch of the West / Zelena
 David Paul Grove as Doc
 Rose McIver as Tinker Bell
 Faustino Di Bauda as Sleepy / Walter
 Keegan Connor Tracy as Blue Fairy / Mother Superior
 Raphael Sbarge as Jiminy Cricket / Dr. Archie Hopper
 Mig Macario as Bashful

 Jeffrey Kaiser as Dopey
 Michael Coleman as Happy
 Sarah Bolger as Aurora
 JoAnna Garcia Swisher as Ariel
 Meghan Ory as Red Riding Hood / Ruby
 Freya Tingley as Wendy Darling
 Chris Gauthier as Mr. Smee
 David Anders as Dr. Victor Frankenstein / Dr. Whale
 Julian Morris as Prince Phillip
 Gil McKinney as Prince Eric
 Christopher Gorham as Wizard of Oz / Walsh
 James Immekus as Michael Darling
 Matt Kane as John Darling
 Jason Burkart as Little John
 Michael P. Northey as Friar Tuck

Guest

 Jamie Chung as Mulan
 Giancarlo Esposito as Sidney Glass / Magic Mirror
Dylan Schmid as Young Baelfire
 Charles Mesure as Blackbeard
 Sunny Mabrey as Glinda the Good Witch
 Stephen Lord as Malcolm
 Christie Laing as Maid Marian
 Ethan Embry as Greg Mendell
 Sonequa Martin-Green as Tamara
 Bernard Curry as Liam Jones
 Skyler Gisondo as Devin
Wyatt Oleff as Young Rumplestiltskin
 Marilyn Manson voices Peter Pan's Shadow
 Alexandra Metz as Rapunzel
 Henri Lubatti as Lumiere
 Rose McGowan as Cora
 David de Lautour as Jonathan
 Eric Lange as Prince Leopold
 Yvette Nicole Brown voices Ursula the Sea Goddess
 Matreya Scarrwener as Dorothy Gale
 Anastasia Griffith as Princess Abigail / Kathryn Nolan
 Tony Amendola as Mister Geppetto / Marco
 Alex Zahara as King Midas
 Eric Keenleyside as Maurice / Moe French
 Jack di Blasio as Lost Boy

Episodes

Production

Development
On May 10, 2013, after the success of Disney's 2013 film Oz the Great and Powerful, ABC ordered Once Upon a Time for a third season, which premiered on September 29, 2013. The same month, it was revealed that the season will feature crossover episodes connecting with the upcoming spin-off series Once Upon a Time in Wonderland. In August 2013, it was announced that the season would be split into two parts, with the first eleven episodes premiering from September 29 to December 2013, while the second half would broadcast from March 9 to May 2014.

The first eleven episodes were set primarily in Neverland; co-creators Adam Horowitz and Edward Kitsis spoke about the setting of the third season stating, "Neverland is a land of belief, a land of imagination, and a land where all our main characters are being stripped down to their core. It's really allowing us, as writers, to dig deep into who they are and to push them forward to new places. I think being in Neverland is going to have a profound effect on each of the characters. It's really fun to see these characters and dig deep this year and explore what it's like for Emma to [be with] her parents. Neverland is really a place where we can sit down and think about that." The two also noted that Peter Pan will feature in the season but will be a more "complicated" version of the character, with Kitsis saying, "We have not yet met Peter Pan and we have not yet seen Neverland, and that is where we're going!" In a further interview, Horowitz stated, "Well for us, Neverland is kind of a place that makes you confront your past. It's sort of the heart of darkness and to be a 200-year-old person, you know because you don't grow up there, you have to keep yourself amused. However long Peter Pan has been there and for whatever reason he has been there, we intend to reveal our take on that and on the legend of Peter Pan. We have a way that it intertwines with our Once Upon a Time mythology that we're really excited to unveil." At Disney's D23 Expo event, the creators hinted at romantic sparks between Emma Swan and Captain Hook, and revelations about how Hook became a pirate. On March 10, 2014, the producers revealed that they may look ahead at incorporating characters from the films The Princess and the Frog, Brave, and Frozen in future episodes, possibly towards the end of the third season if they get the green light from Disney. Later that month, it was announced that the season finale will air on May 11, 2014 and have a duration of two hours.

Casting

In May 2013, it was revealed that season two regular Meghan Ory would be departing the show to star in CBS's upcoming sci-fi drama Intelligence. However, Ory stated that she would still be open for more episodes on the show as a guest member. Ory later made appearances in episodes 12, 13 and the season finale. The same month, it was announced that Michael Raymond-James had been promoted from a recurring cast member to a series regular for the season. In July 2013, it was reported that Giancarlo Esposito would be returning as Magic Mirror/Sidney Glass following his absence from season two. In the same month, it was announced that the role of Robin Hood had been recast from Tom Ellis to Sean Maguire. British actor Robbie Kay played the role of Peter Pan, the villain for the first half of the season. On July 29, it was reported that Rose McIver had been cast as Tinker Bell. For episode five, Bernard Curry played a guest role as Captain Hook's brother Liam, while a member of the Lost Boys called Devin was portrayed by Skyler Gisondo. Joanna Garcia was later cast as Ariel. On September 3, 2013, Gil McKinney was cast in the recurring role of Prince Eric. On October 18, 2013, it was revealed that the American musician Marilyn Manson would voice the character of The Shadow. On October 21, British actor Stephen Lord was announced to be playing Rumplestiltskin's father, Malcolm. He featured in the eighth and eleventh episodes of the season.

For the second half of the season, Rebecca Mader was cast as the main villain, the Wicked Witch of the West Zelena. Alexandra Metz was later cast as Rapunzel. Rose McGowan returned as a young Cora for the season's eighteenth episode, while the introduction of a young King Leopold as a Prince played by Eric Lange, and the return of Princess Eva, played by Eva Bourne, was also featured. Charles Mesure was cast as Blackbeard in January 2014, to appear in one episode as an enemy of Captain Hook. In February 2014, a casting call was opened for an actress in her mid-to-late twenties to recur as Glinda the Good Witch, a role later landed with Sunny Mabrey.

After Once Upon a Time in Wonderland was canceled, it was reported that Michael Socha, who plays the Knave of Hearts in that series, was in talks to join the main cast in season four. In April 2014, it was confirmed that Michael Socha will become a regular for the following season.

Promotion
On September 12, 2013, ABC released the original cast promotional photos for the season. However, due to fan backlash, the photos were removed. Instead, new photos were promoted via social networking outlets with the tag-line '#SaveHenry'. The second half of the season used the tag-line "#WickedIsComing" for promotional pre-release and "#WickedVsEvil" for most of its run.

Filming
Set in Neverland, filming of the first half of season three was shot in a versatile set inside a Vancouver soundstage, re-dressed to represent up to twelve different tropical locales, including the camps of Peter Pan, Mr. Gold and the other residents of Storybrooke. The expensive set took a month to construct and was inspired by both Disney's animated Peter Pan movie and the Ewok village from Return of the Jedi. Foliage wrangler Sarah McCulloch spoke of the set-up saying, "It took us five days to assemble all the plants. We have 200 real plants that have to be watered and pruned every day and heated at night, 30 actual tree stumps and 450 fake branches" to which silk leaves were added. The Storybrooke scenes were again shot in Steveston, British Columbia, Canada.

Ratings

References

External links

2013 American television seasons
2014 American television seasons
Season 3